Erik Hort (born February 16, 1987 in Montebello, New York) is an American soccer player who is currently a Free Agent.

Hort grew up In Montebello, NY. He is one of five children. His father, David Hort, is of Austrian descent and Mother, Ora Hort, is of Israeli descent. Hort grew up In the academy PDA (Players Development Academy) In New Jersey. Hort was also a member of the Eastern New York ODP, Regional and National Team. Very promising career ahead of him, Hort broke his leg in 2000 right before the National Team try outs, but quickly bounced back. 
In Hort's Senior year of Highschool He was discovered by Czech powerhouse Sparta Prague during a trip with the Regional team.  He was eventually signed by them and spent one and a half seasons on their reserve team before joining the Fire in the fall of 2006. He has the ability to play several positions and can create opportunities with his great ability. After the year with the Fire Hort spent the next year going through two Sports Hernia surgeries In 2007-2008 before coming back and signing with Maccabi Tel Aviv. 
In 2009 Hort joined Maccabi Tel Aviv In the Israeli First Division where he signed for a year before moving to Hapoel Ra'anana also in the First Division, moving from the Second the year before.

He earned 3 caps with the United States U-20 men's national soccer team in 2006.

Career statistics

Footnotes

External links
 Profile at MLSNet
 
 

1987 births
Living people
Jewish American sportspeople
Soccer players from New York (state)
American expatriate soccer players
Chicago Fire FC players
Maccabi Tel Aviv F.C. players
Hapoel Ra'anana A.F.C. players
Sevilla FC Puerto Rico players
USL Championship players
Israeli Premier League players
United States men's under-20 international soccer players
American soccer players
Association football defenders
21st-century American Jews